The men's team foil was one of eight fencing events on the fencing at the 1976 Summer Olympics programme. It was the fourteenth appearance of the event. The competition was held from 24 to 25 July 1976. 63 fencers from 14 nations competed.

One of the gold medalists from West Germany team was Thomas Bach, who currently serves as President of the International Olympic Committee.

Participating teams

Results

Round 1

Round 1 Pool A 

Great Britain and the Soviet Union each defeated Romania, 8–8 (59–52) and 9–7, respectively. The two victors then faced off. The Soviet Union won 9–3.

Round 1 Pool B 

Hungary and France each defeated Cuba, 10–6 and 11–5, respectively. The two victors then faced off. France won 9–1.

Round 1 Pool C 

The first two rounds of matches left Italy and West Germany at 2–0 apiece (advancing to the knockout rounds) and Japan and Kuwait at 0–2 each (eliminating them). Italy defeated West Germany 9–7 to take the top spot in the group. Kuwait finished with only a single bout won, out of 48.

Round 1 Pool D 

The first two rounds of matches left Poland and the United States at 2–0 apiece (advancing to the knockout rounds) and Hong Kong and Iran at 0–2 each (eliminating them). Poland defeated the United States 9–2 to take the top spot in the group.

Elimination rounds

References

Foil team
Men's events at the 1976 Summer Olympics